Mats Wilander was the defending champion but lost in the quarterfinals this year.

Aaron Krickstein won the title, defeating Henrik Sundström 6–7, 6–1, 6–4 in the final.

Seeds

  Mats Wilander (quarterfinals)
  Henrik Sundström (final)
  Juan Aguilera (quarterfinals)
  Tomáš Šmíd (quarterfinals)
  Aaron Krickstein (champion)
  Libor Pimek (semifinals)
  Zoltan Kuharszky (first round)
  Emilio Sánchez (first round)

Draw

Finals

Top half

Bottom half

External links
 ATP main draw

1984 in Swiss sport
1984 Grand Prix (tennis)
1984 Geneva Open